Swan Creek Preserve Metropark is a regional park in Toledo, Ohio, owned and managed by Metroparks Toledo. The park contains several miles of often used trails.

References

External links
Metroparks Toledo
Park Map

Parks in Toledo, Ohio
Protected areas of Lucas County, Ohio
Metroparks Toledo